Scots administrative law governs the rules of administrative law in Scotland, the body of case law, statutes, secondary legislation and articles which provide the framework of procedures for judicial control over government agencies and private bodies.

See also

 Bannatyne v Overtoun
 Burmah Oil Co Ltd v Lord Advocate
 Judicial review in Scotland
 MacCormick v Lord Advocate
 West v Secretary of State for Scotland

References

Further reading
A source book and history of administrative law in Scotland, by various authors, edited by M.R. McLarty, assisted by G. Campbell H. Paton, London, W. Hodge, 1956

 
Administrative law